The Congregation of the Penitent Sisters of Our Lady of Fatima is a contemplative Roman Catholic religious order founded in 1959 Bro. Francisco Tolentino F.T., a hermit, at Rosario, Malinao, Aklan, the Philippines. The nuns are discalced, and live as penitents. Manual labor is done by the nuns.

External links
  Penitent Sisters of Our Lady of Fatima at malinao-aklan.gov.ph

Catholic Church in the Philippines